Japaga may refer to:

 Japaga, Bosnia and Herzegovina, a village near Han Pijesak
 Japaga, Croatia, a village near Lipik